Edwin Rivas (born January 8, 1992) is a Guatemalan-American soccer player who currently plays for Liga Nacional club Santa Lucía.

Career

College and Amateur
Rivas spent his entire college career at California State University, Northridge.  He made a total of 78 appearances for the Matadors and tallied 17 goals and 10 assists.

He also played in the Premier Development League for Ventura County Fusion and Los Angeles Misioneros.

Professional
On January 15, 2015, Rivas was selected in the second round (37th overall) of the 2015 MLS SuperDraft by Toronto FC.  Two months later, he signed a professional contract with USL affiliate club Toronto FC II.  He made his professional debut on April 19 in a 1–1 draw against Whitecaps FC 2. Rivas was let go at the end of the 2015 season as his contract was not renewed .

Rivas joined USL Championship side Las Vegas Lights on January 9, 2019.

References

External links
Cal State Northridge bio
USSF Development Academy bio

1992 births
Living people
American soccer players
American expatriate soccer players
Cal State Northridge Matadors men's soccer players
Ventura County Fusion players
LA Laguna FC players
Toronto FC II players
Association football forwards
Soccer players from Los Angeles
Expatriate soccer players in Canada
Toronto FC draft picks
USL League Two players
USL Championship players
Las Vegas Lights FC players